The second season of the reality television series Basketball Wives LA aired on VH1 from September 10, 2012 until December 17, 2012. It follows the lives of a group of women who have all been somehow romantically linked to professional basketball players.

It was executively produced by Pam Healey, Sean Rankine, Amanda Scott, Shaunie O'Neal, Mark Seliga, and Lisa Shannon.

Production
Basketball Wives LA was revealed on June 20, 2011, with Kimsha Artest, Gloria Govan, Laura Govan, Jackie Christie and Imani Showalter as the cast. Malaysia Pargo and Draya Michele were announced as part of the cast in the series' July 2011 press release. Kimsha Artest stopped showing up for filming because she did not agree with the "shenanigans and drama", which explains why she was not featured in more than one episode. Tanya Williams was to be the eighth official "wife" but left the series after two episodes. The series premiered on August 29, 2011, to 1.81 million viewers.

The second season of Basketball Wives LA debuted on September 10, 2012, with the premiere attracting 1.82 million viewers. Imani Showalter did not return because she felt that reality television wasn't for her, and she moved back to New York. Brooke Bailey joined as a main cast member, with Adiz "Bambi" Benson joining in a recurring role.

Cast

Main
Draya Michele: Model/Actress
Brooke Bailey: Girlfriend of Vernon Macklin
Gloria Govan: Wife of Matt Barnes
Laura Govan: Gloria's sister
Malaysia Pargo: Wife of Jannero Pargo
Jackie Christie: Wife of Doug Christie

Recurring
Bambi Benson: Malaysia's Friend

Episodes

References

2012 American television seasons
Basketball Wives